The 1996 Southern Illinois Salukis football team represented Southern Illinois University as a member of the Gateway Football Conference during the 1996 NCAA Division I-AA football season. They were led by third-year head coach Shawn Watson and played their home games at McAndrew Stadium in Carbondale, Illinois. The Salukis finished the season with a 5–6 record overall and a 1–4 record in conference play.

Schedule

References

Southern Illinois
Southern Illinois Salukis football seasons
Southern Illinois Salukis football